Laupstad is a village in Vågan Municipality in Nordland county, Norway. The European route E10 highway runs through the village.

References

Vågan
Villages in Nordland
Populated places of Arctic Norway